Mid Devon District Council in Devon, England is elected every four years. Since the last boundary changes in 2003, 42 councillors have been elected from 24 wards.

Political control
The first election to the council was held in 1973, initially operating as a shadow authority before coming into its powers on 1 April 1974. Political control of the council since 1973 has been held by the following parties:

Leadership
The leaders of the council since 2013 have been:

Council elections
1973 Tiverton District Council election
1976 Tiverton District Council election
1979 Mid Devon District Council election (New ward boundaries)
1983 Mid Devon District Council election
1987 Mid Devon District Council election (District boundary changes took place but the number of seats remained the same)
1991 Mid Devon District Council election
1995 Mid Devon District Council election (District boundary changes took place but the number of seats remained the same)
1999 Mid Devon District Council election
2003 Mid Devon District Council election (New ward boundaries increased the number of seats by 2)
2007 Mid Devon District Council election
2011 Mid Devon District Council election
2015 Mid Devon District Council election
2019 Mid Devon District Council election

By-election results

1995–1999

1999–2003

2003–2007

2007–2011

References

By-election results

External links
Mid Devon District Council

 
Mid Devon District
Council elections in Devon
District council elections in England